Niue's Department of Agriculture, Forestry and Fisheries (DAFF) is a division of Niue's Ministry of Natural Resources alongside the Department of Environment and the Department of Meteorological Service. The key pelagic fisheries of Niue consist of tuna - including albacore, bigeye, skipjack, and yellowfin - as well as billfish, mahi mahi, and wahoo. Other key fisheries include cod, sea cucumbers, crustaceans and shellfish, and trevally. Niue has a 470,000 square kilometer exclusive economic zone in which it may fish.

The director of DAFF is Poi Okesene.

The management and development of Niue's fisheries is guided by a number of policies:
Territorial Sea and Exclusive Economic Zones Act 1996
Domestic Fishing Act 1995
Domestic Fishing Regulations 1996
Territorial Sea and Exclusive Economic Zone License (Fees) Regulations 2010

In 2015, the Cabinet of Niue made a decision to ban the exportation of uga (coconut crab) from Niue. As a preventative measure, biosecurity officers at New Zealand's airports have begun checking passengers travelling from Niue.

References

Niue
Fisheries ministries